White Deer High School is a public high school located in White Deer, Texas (USA) and classified as a 1A school by the UIL. It is part of the White Deer Independent School District located in east central Carson County. In 2015, the school was rated "Met Standard" by the Texas Education Agency.

Athletics
The White Deer Bucks compete in these sports - 

Basketball
Cross Country
Football
Golf
Powerlifting
Tennis
Track and Field

State Titles
Boys Basketball - 
1962(1A)
Football - 
1958(1A), 1988(1A)
One Act Play - 
1949(B), 1954(1A), 1956(B), 1965(1A)

References

External links
White Deer ISD

Public high schools in Texas
Schools in Carson County, Texas